, son of regent Takatsukasa Fusasuke and adopted son of regent Kaneteru, was a kugyō (court noble) of the Edo period (1603–1868) of Japan. He held a regents position kampaku from 1737 to 1746. He married a daughter of Asano Tsunanaga, fourth head of Hiroshima Domain, and an adopted daughter of Ikeda Tsunamasa, second head of Okayama Domain.

Family
 Father: Takatsukasa Fusasuke
 Mother: daughter of Yamashina Tokiyuki
 Foster father: Ichijo Kaneteru
 Wives:
 daughter of Asano Tsunanaga
 Tomoko, an adopted daughter of Ikeda Tsunamasa
 Concubine: Commoner
 Children:
 Ichijō Michika by Commoner
 Takatsukasa Mototeru
 Ikuko, consort of Tokugawa Munemasa
 Akiko, consort of Tokugawa Munetada
 Shigeko, consort of Tokugawa Munemoto
 Daigo Kanezumi (1747-1758)
 Ichijo Tomiko, consort of Emperor Momozono and mother of Emperor Go-Momozono by Commoner

References

 
  

1692 births
1751 deaths
Fujiwara clan
Ichijō family
Takatsukasa family